The 2023 FINA Women's Water Polo World Cup will be the 18th edition of the tournament. It will run from 11 April to 25 June 2023. The Super final will take place between 23 and 25 June 2023 in Long Beach, United States.

From this year on, the tournament will be replacing the FINA Water Polo World League.

Format
There will be two divisions. In Division 1, the top eight teams from the World Championships will play. They will play a round-robin in April, at pre-selected venues. All other teams can sign up in Division 2, in which each continent will host a qualification tournament. The top two teams from the tournaments will play in an intercontinental tournament. The top-six teams of Division 1 and the top-two teams from Division 2 will compete in the super final, held between 23 and 25 June 2023. At the end of the tournament, the last-ranked team will be relegated to Division 2 and the winner of Division 2 will move to Division 1 for the following year. A win will give a team three points, a win after penalties two, a loss after penalites one and a loss after regular time zero points.

Division 1
The draw was held on 1 December 2022. The first tournament will be played from 11 to 13 April in Rotterdam, Netherlands and the second tournament between 19 and 21 April 2023 in Athens, Grecce. The top four teams from the first tournament are qualified for the super final but will participate in the second tournament aswell, where the last two spots will be played out.

Group A

Group B

Division 2
The tournament will take place in Berlin, Germany between 1 and 7 May 2023.

Super final
The tournament will take place at the Long Beach City College in Long Beach, United States between 23 and 25 June 2023.

References

2023
2023 in water polo
FINA